The Awa'uq Massacre or Refuge Rock Massacre, or, more recently, as the Wounded Knee of Alaska, was an attack and massacre of Koniag Alutiiq (Sugpiaq) people in April 1784 at Refuge Rock near Kodiak Island by Russian fur trader Grigory Shelekhov and 130 armed Russian men and cannoneers of his Shelikhov-Golikov Company.

Massacre
Since 1775 Shelekhov had been trading with Alaska Natives in the Kuril  and Aleutian islands of present-day Alaska. In April 1784 he returned to found a settlement on Kodiak Island and the coast of the mainland. The people occupying the area initially resisted, and fled to the secluded stack island Refuge Rock (Awa'uq in Alutiiq language, approximate meaning 'where one becomes numb') of Partition Cove on Sitkalidak Island. It was across Old Harbor in the Kodiak Archipelago. 

The Russian promyshlennikis attacked the people on the island by shooting guns and cannons, slaughtering an estimated 200 to 500 men, women and children on Refuge Rock. Some sources state the number killed was as many as 2,000, or 3,000 persons. Following the attack of Awa'uq, Shelikhov claimed to have captured over 1,000 people, detaining some 400 as hostages, including children. The Russians suffered no casualties. 

This massacre was an isolated incident, but the violence and taking of hostages resulted in the Alutiiq becoming completely subjugated by Russian traders thereafter. Qaspeq (literally: "kuspuk"), was an Alutiiq (Sugpiaq) who had been taken as a child as a hostage from Kodiak; he was raised in servitude by the Russians in the Aleutians. Having learned Russian, he became an interpreter for them with the Alutiiq. Qaspeq had once betrayed the location of a refuge island just offshore of Unalaska Island.

More than five decades after the massacre, Arsenti Aminak, an old Sugpiaq man who had survived the massacre, reported his account of these events to Henrik Johan Holmberg (sometimes known as Heinrich Johann) (1818–1864), a Finnish naturalist and ethnographer. Holmberg was collecting data for the Russian governor of Alaska. 

Aminak said:

Aftermath
The years 1784–1818 were called the "darkest period of Sugpiaq history," as the Russians treated the people badly. They also suffered high mortality from infectious diseases unwittingly introduced by the Russians. In 1818 there was a change in the management of what was then known as the Russian-American Company, referring to Russians operating in North America. 

In 1827 collection of yasak (ясак) tax was banned by Catherine the Great.

References

External links 
GOOGLE Maps : Awa’uq or Refuge Rock (the secluded island in Partition Cove)

1784 murders in North America
Alutiiq
Conflicts in 1784
Crimes in Alaska
Imperial Russian war crimes
Massacres committed by Russia
Massacres in 1784
Massacres of Native Americans
Murder in Alaska
Russian America
ru:Алутиик#.D0.A0.D0.B5.D0.B7.D0.BD.D1.8F .D0.B2 .D0.90.D0.B2.D0.B0.D1.83.D0.BA.D0.B5